Isak Dawid "Dawie" van der Walt (born 11 February 1983) is a South African professional golfer. He won twice on the European Tour in 2013, both times in South Africa, and won twice on the Web.com Tour in 2015. He currently plays on the PGA Tour.

Amateur career
Van der Walt was born in Paarl, South Africa. He played college golf at Lamar University in the United States, graduating in 2007. He represented South Africa in the 2004 and 2006 Eisenhower Trophy events.

Professional career
Van der Walt turned professional in 2007 and played on the Sunshine Tour and U.S. mini-tours since 2008. He won four mini-tour events between 2008 and 2011. His best finish on the Sunshine Tour Order of Merit was 18th in 2012. In 2011 and 2012, he also played on the Web.com Tour where his best finish was 2nd at the 2012 Cox Classic.

In 2013, van der Walt won the Tshwane Open, co-sanctioned by the Sunshine Tour and the European Tour.

Van der Walt's busy schedule for 2013 also included the Web.com Tour (where he tried to earn a PGA Tour card) and the European Tour, where he has status until 2015 provided he plays a minimum thirteen events a year. Van der Walt finished 52nd on the 2013 Web.com Tour money list and didn't make a cut during the Web.com Tour Finals.

Van der Walt earned his second win of 2013 at the Nelson Mandela Championship. Although he was not the Sunshine Tour's leading money winner, he was named the winner of the Order of Merit since Charl Schwartzel did not play enough events to be rated. The honour also earned him entry into the 2014 Open Championship, his first major. He was part of the longest playoff in Web.com Tour history during the 2014 Cleveland Open, losing to New Zealand's Steven Alker on the eleventh playoff hole.

After three runner-up finishes on the Web.com Tour, van der Walt finally earned his first tour win at the 2015 Chile Classic. He won the Price Cutter Charity Championship later in the season. The finished the season second in the money list and gained a place on the 2015–16 PGA Tour.

Van der Walt made the cut just 11 times in 25 events on the 2015–16 PGA Tour and lost his card, returning to the Web.com for 2017. His best finish since 2017 has been tied for third place in the 2019 TPC Colorado Championship.

In 2021, van der Walt earned his PGA Tour card for the 2021–22 PGA Tour season by finishing 17th in the Korn Ferry Tour Finals.

Professional wins (8)

European Tour wins (2)

*Note: The 2013 Nelson Mandela Championship was shortened to 54 holes due to rain.
1Co-sanctioned by the Sunshine Tour

Sunshine Tour wins (2)

*Note: The 2013 Nelson Mandela Championship was shortened to 54 holes due to rain.
1Co-sanctioned by the European Tour

Sunshine Tour playoff record (0–1)

Web.com Tour wins (2)

Web.com Tour playoff record (0–1)

NGA Hooters Tour wins (1)
2008 Onion Creek Classic

Adams Pro Golf Tour wins (3)
2008 Mary Bird Perkins Merrill Lynch Open
2009 Lake Charles Open
2011 Southwest Louisiana Lions Club Open

Results in major championships

CUT = missed the halfway cut
Note: van der Walt only played in The Open Championship.

Results in World Golf Championships

"T" = Tied

Team appearances
Amateur
Eisenhower Trophy (representing South Africa): 2004, 2006

See also
2015 Web.com Tour Finals graduates
2021 Korn Ferry Tour Finals graduates

References

External links

South African male golfers
Lamar Cardinals golfers
Sunshine Tour golfers
European Tour golfers
PGA Tour golfers
Korn Ferry Tour graduates
Golfers from Houston
Sportspeople from Paarl
People from Kingwood, Texas
1983 births
Living people